Angoram, also known as Pondo and by its speakers as Kanda, is a Papuan language of Papua New Guinea.

Maramba, listed in Ethnologue, has been found by Foley (2018: 226) to in fact be a dialect of Angoram that is spoken in Maramba village.

References

External links 
 PARADISEC open-access archive of Angoram language recordings

Lower Sepik languages
Languages of East Sepik Province